The Women's team pursuit at the 2013 UCI Track Cycling World Championships was held on February 21. 10 nations of 3 cyclists each participated in the contest. After the qualifying, the fastest 2 teams raced for gold, and 3rd and 4th teams raced for bronze.

Medalists

Results

Qualifying
The qualifying was held at 14:20.

Finals
The finals were held at 20:20.

Small Final

Final

References

2013 UCI Track Cycling World Championships
UCI Track Cycling World Championships – Women's team pursuit